The Tennessee Volunteers women's rowing team is the most recently added sport at the University of Tennessee (UT). The team began in 1995 and since then has grown to new heights. Since 2014, the team has competed in the Big 12 Conference, which took over the rowing league formerly operated by Conference USA. UT is joined in Big 12 rowing by one of its historic rivals in its all-sports league, the Southeastern Conference, in Alabama. The Volunteers, then known as Lady Volunteers, won their first conference championship in 2010.

Along with other UT women's sports teams, it used the nickname "Lady Volunteers" (or the short form "Lady Vols") until the 2015–16 school year, when the school dropped the "Lady" prefix from the nicknames of all women's teams except in basketball. In 2017 the “Lady Vol” name was reinstated.

Overview

During Lisa Glenn's 19-year stint at UT she has helped guide the 22-year program to seven appearances at the NCAA Championships, including three consecutive full-team selections in 2006, 2007, and 2008. Glenn helped propel the Lady Vols to new heights in the 2010 season, leading the Lady Vols to its first-ever Conference-USA rowing championship. Glenn was also named C-USA Coach of the Year for her efforts in helping the Lady Vols accomplish this historic achievement. Under Glenn's guidance, senior Laura Miller was named the C-USA rower of the year, while three other Lady Vols captured All-Conference honors. Glenn is only the second coach in Lady Vol rowing history, Glenn has a strong track record of producing stellar student-athletes. Five Lady Vols have taken home All-America accolades. Former rower Erin-Monique Shelton garnered second-team honors for the third consecutive year in 2008, joining Chelsea Pemberton as the only Tennessee rowers to earn All-America honors three times in a row.

In 2007-08, the Lady Vol rowing team garnered new heights for the program. For the first time in Tennessee history, Head Coach Lisa Glenn guided one of her shells to the grand finals at the NCAA Championship, and the team’s third consecutive full-team appearance at the event. The fifth-place showing by the 2V8+ in the grand final was the programs best finish.

Tennessee Boathouse
When Coach Lisa Glenn arrived at UT she had a vision of a state of the art boat house for the Lady Vols rowing team to call home. Ground work for the Tennessee Boathouse began in September 1999 when the first shovel was driven into the ground on the north side of the Tennessee River. Now over ten years later, she and the team have a place to call home for the newest sports program at Tennessee. The three-story building is the permanent home of the University of Tennessee Lady Volunteer Rowing Team. The facility, located directly across the street from Neyland Stadium on the waterfront, anchors the west end of Knoxville's Volunteer Landing waterfront development and jettisons 40-feet out over the water with balconies overlooking the Tennessee River. The structure stands beside the "Vol Navy" docks. The 180-foot floating dock has enough space to launch three eights at once. The ground level boat bay holds 26 boats including singles, pairs, quads, fours and eights. The Tennessee River can be viewed through windows spanning the entire south wall.

All-Americans 

The Tennessee Volunteers rowing team has featured seven USRowing All-Americans/CRCA Pocock All-Americans

Amy Delashmit - 1997 USRowing All-American
Kaitlin Bargreen - 2003 CRCA Pocock 1st Team All-American & 2005 CRCA Pocock 2nd Team All-American
Chelsea Pemberton - 2003, 2005 CRCA Pocock 2nd Team All-American & 2004 CRCA Pocock 1st Team All-American 
Andrea Bagwell - 2005 CRCA Pocock 2nd Team All-American
Erin-Monique Shelton - 2006, 2007, 2008 CRCA Pocock 2nd Team All-American
Laura Miller - 2010 CRCA Pocock 2nd Team All-American
Erika Lauderdale - 2012 CRCA Pocock 2nd Team All-American

See also 
NCAA Rowing Championship

References

External links
 

Rowing
College rowing teams in the United States
1995 establishments in Tennessee
Sports clubs established in 1995
Women's rowing in the United States
Women's sports in Tennessee